Kumar Ailani ( born 16 December 1960 )  is an Indian politician and member of Bharatiya Janata Party. Ailani was elected in 2009 & 2019 Maharashtra Legislative Assembly representing the ulhasnagar 141 constituency.

Positions held
 2009: Elected to Maharashtra Legislative Assembly (1st term)
 2019: Re-Elected to Maharashtra Legislative Assembly (2nd term)

References

People from Ulhasnagar
Members of the Maharashtra Legislative Assembly
Living people
Year of birth missing (living people) 
Bharatiya Janata Party politicians from Maharashtra